Gianmario Pellizzari (19 December 1944 – 20 June 2022) was an Italian farmer and politician.

A member of the Christian Democracy party, he served in the Chamber of Deputies from 1976 to 1992.

Pellizzari died on 20 June 2022 at the age of 77.

References

1944 births
2022 deaths
Deputies of Legislature VII of Italy
Deputies of Legislature VIII of Italy
Deputies of Legislature IX of Italy
Deputies of Legislature X of Italy
Christian Democracy (Italy) members of the Chamber of Deputies (Italy)
Italian farmers
People from the Province of Verona